Leslie N. "Dukie"  Speck (November 12, 1913 – August 14, 2004) was an American football and basketball player and coach of football.  He served as the head football coach at Arkansas State College—now known as Arkansas State University—from 1936 to 1938, compiling a record of 7–13.

Head coaching record

References

External links
 

1913 births
2004 deaths
American men's basketball players
Arkansas State Red Wolves football coaches
Arkansas State Red Wolves football players
Arkansas State Red Wolves men's basketball players